Montmajor is a municipality in the comarca of Berguedà, Catalonia.

Geography
Montmajor is made up of four distinct enclaves, quite separated from one another. The principal area of the municipality lies east of the town of Navès, which is in the comarca of Solsonès. The northernmost enclave is Catllarí (5.45 km²), which is surrounded by the municipalities of Fígols, Castellar del Riu, and Guixers. Comesposades (8.01 km²), is separated from the main town by L'Espunyola. Valielles (3.20 km²), meanwhile, is an enclave completely surrounded by Solsonès.

References

External links
Town Website
 Government data pages 

Municipalities in Berguedà